Falls Church High School (FCHS) is a high school located in West Falls Church, Virginia, in unincorporated Fairfax County. While the school has a Falls Church mailing address, the school does not serve the City of Falls Church, which is served by Meridian High School. The school serves grades 9 through 12. It was relocated from its former site in downtown Falls Church to the current address, 7521 Jaguar Trail, Falls Church, Virginia 22042, in 1967 Falls Church High's school motto is "Building on Our Success." The mascot for the school is a Jaguar. The school colors are dark green and white. The principal is Benjamin Nowak.

Demographics
There were 2,103 students enrolled in Falls Church High School 2022–2023 school year. Of those, 1,290 (61.34%) were Hispanic, 306 (14.55%) were Asian, 317 (15.07%) were white (non-Hispanic); 116 (5.52%) were black (non-Hispanic); and 74 (3.52%) were from another ethnic group or more than one. In terms of gender, from the 2018-2019 school year, 935 students identified as females (46.08%) and 1,094 identified as male (53.92%). Most of Falls Church High School's students (90%) are enrolled in general education. Some students are enrolled in special education, and some receive English Learner services. The graduation rate is 85%.

Location
Prior to 1967, the school was located at Hillwood Avenue and Cherry Street in Falls Church, Virginia. Construction began in 1944 during WWII and was completed in 1945. It then moved to its current location at 7521 Jaguar Trail, Falls Church, Virginia 22042. It is located off Arlington Boulevard, near Kingsley Commons - formerly Jefferson Village Apartments, and Graham Road Shopping Center (the extreme parcel of the historic Falls Church Airpark).

Test scores
Falls Church High School is fully accredited based on its Virginia Standards of Learning test performance. The school was listed as the 603rd best high school in America by U.S. News & World Report in 2013.

Recent history
On December 5, 2006, Falls Church High School was named a National Demonstration Site for the elective class Advancement Via Individual Determination (AVID). Falls Church is one of fifteen schools in Fairfax County that have a full four-year AVID program.

With the start of the 2010–2011 school year, Falls Church gained some of Annandale High School's population as the result of the Annandale Border Control Force (ABCF) and their actions.

Extracurricular activities

Band

The FCHS Marching Jags were named honor band in 2006. They also won a superior rating in 2008, with their show "Music of the Police" and another superior rating in 2009 concert festival with selections titled "True Blue March," "Chant and Jubilo," and "Dominion in the Sky."

Football
During the 2009 football season, The Jaguars maintained a 5-5 record, led by varsity quarterback Ajay Kashyap, during the regular season. The high note of the season was during week seven, when the Jaguars upset the AAA National District powerhouse Thomas A. Edison High School (Fairfax County, Virginia) Eagles 16-14. This was the Jaguars' first win over the Eagles since 1998 and the Eagles' first AAA National District loss since 2005. The Jaguars also won their homecoming against the Mount Vernon High School Majors 42-32 and also the Bell Game against rival J. E. B. Stuart High School 42-20. During the season, senior running back Marcus Hughes rushed for a region high 1,741 yards on 245 carries, averaging 7.2 yards per carry and 19 touchdowns.

In 2014, the Jaguars went 7-3, and lost in the first round of the playoffs. In 2016, the Jaguars went 7-3, again winning the conference, and again losing the Albemarle in the first round of the playoffs. In 2018, the varsity football team won the 2018 National District Championship.

Baseball
In 1984, the school's baseball field was named Al McCullock Field for baseball coach Al McCullock, whose son has the same honor at Herndon High School.

Notable alumni

 Bob Buckhorn, mayor of Tampa, Florida,  graduated in 1976
 Wes Johnson, voice of the Washington Capitals, video game voice actor ("The Elder Scrolls V: Skyrim", "Fallout 3", "Oblivion", "Star Trek: Legacy") movie actor ("A Dirty Shame", "The Invasion", "Hearts in Atlantis (film)")
 Omar Fateh, Minnesota State Senator
 Sandy Alderson, General Manager of the New York Mets, former CEO of the San Diego Padres, former Major League Baseball Executive Vice President for Baseball Operations, former GM of the Oakland Athletics.
 Michael Norell, actor/screenwriter, known for playing Captain Hank Stanley in the television series Emergency!
 Rich Sauveur, former MLB player (Pittsburgh Pirates, Montreal Expos, New York Mets, Kansas City Royals, Chicago White Sox, Oakland Athletics)
 Robert D. Hull, member of the Virginia House of Delegates
 OJ Porteria, soccer player for Filipino national team
 Bill Bell, football player
 Tatianna, contestant on RuPaul’s Drag Race season 2 and All-Stars season 2

References

External links
 Falls Church High School
 Falls Church Athletics

Public high schools in Virginia
High schools in Fairfax County, Virginia
Educational institutions established in 1945
1945 establishments in Virginia